María Acosta (born 26 November 1991) is a Venezuelan freestyle wrestler.

She competed in the women's freestyle 69 kg event at the 2016 Summer Olympics, in which she was eliminated in the round of 16 by Enas Mostafa. 
She won the silver medal in the women's freestyle 69 kg event at the 2015 Pan American Games.

She won one of the bronze medals in her event at the 2022 Pan American Wrestling Championships held in Acapulco, Mexico. She won the bronze medal in her event at the 2022 Bolivarian Games held in Valledupar, Colombia. She won the silver medal in her event at the 2022 South American Games held in Asunción, Paraguay.

References

External links
 

1991 births
Living people
Venezuelan female sport wrestlers
Olympic wrestlers of Venezuela
Wrestlers at the 2016 Summer Olympics
Wrestlers at the 2015 Pan American Games
Pan American Games silver medalists for Venezuela
Pan American Games medalists in wrestling
South American Games silver medalists for Venezuela
South American Games bronze medalists for Venezuela
South American Games medalists in wrestling
Competitors at the 2018 South American Games
Competitors at the 2022 South American Games
Medalists at the 2015 Pan American Games
Pan American Wrestling Championships medalists
21st-century Venezuelan women